"Sweetness" is a song by American rock band Jimmy Eat World. It was released in June 2002 as the third single from their 2001 album, Bleed American. It was originally written soon after the band finished recording Clarity but before the label had finally decided to release the album. However, "Lucky Denver Mint" became a surprise radio hit off of Clarity before the album was even released, driving the label to release Clarity before "Sweetness" could ever be added to its tracklisting. The band also played the song live many times during the Clarity tour, and a demo recording of it was included on the 2007 re-issue of Clarity.

Critical reception
Like the rest of Bleed American, "Sweetness" was generally well received by critics. Punknews.org stated that "'Sweetness' is so unbelievably catchy, I'm having trouble coming up with an analogy to get it across."

Music video
The video for "Sweetness", directed by Tim Hope, depicts the band performing the song in a bedroom while apparently recording a demo cassette. Compositing and various forms of animation (including stop-motion, rotoscoping, and computer animation) were used to add surreal elements throughout the video, as well as to show the band performing in different locations: a bar, a concert, and a recording studio.

Track listing
UK 7" vinyl
"Sweetness" (3:40)
"Clarity" (live) (4:24)

UK CD1
"Sweetness" (3:40)
"Blister" (live) (5:52)
"Your New Aesthetic" (live) (2:46)

UK CD2
 Sweetness
"A Praise Chorus" (live) (4:05)
"Lucky Denver Mint" (live) (3:11)
"Sweetness" (video)

Australian single (2002)
"Sweetness" (3:41)
"If You Don't, Don't" (live La Scala 10 November 2001) (4:29)
"Lucky Denver Mint" (live La Scala 10 November 2001) (3:12)
"Sweetness" (*.mov video) (3:59)
"Goodbye Sky Harbor" (*.mov video) (live La Scala 10 November 2001) (3:29)

Charts

In popular culture
The song was also featured on the soundtrack for the EA Sports video game NHL 2003.

Since the 2017–18 NHL season, the Florida Panthers have used "Sweetness" as their goal song.

The song is also available as a downloadable song in the music/rhythm game Rock Band 2.

References

Jimmy Eat World songs
2002 singles
2001 songs
Animated music videos
DreamWorks Records singles